Tian Hua (born 14 December 1928) is a Chinese actress most famous for her role of Xi Er in the 1950 film The White-haired Girl.

Personal life
In 1949, Tian married Su Fan, who was one of the stage designer of PRC founding ceremony. Tian is the best friend with actress Zhao Lirong. In 2015, a website reported that Tian's husband and son suffered from cancer, and ran out of money for medical treatment.

Selected filmography

References

External links

1928 births
Living people
Chinese film actresses